In mathematics, a uniform matroid is a matroid in which the independent sets are exactly the sets containing at most r elements, for some fixed integer r. An alternative definition is that every permutation of the elements is a symmetry.

Definition
The uniform matroid  is defined over a set of  elements. A subset of the elements is independent if and only if it contains at most  elements. A subset is a basis if it has exactly  elements, and it is a circuit if it has exactly  elements.

A matroid of rank  is uniform if and only if all of its circuits have exactly  elements.

The matroid  is called the -point line.

Duality and minors
The dual matroid of the uniform matroid  is another uniform matroid . A uniform matroid is self-dual if and only if .

Every minor of a uniform matroid is uniform. Restricting a uniform matroid  by one element (as long as ) produces the matroid
 and contracting it by one element (as long as ) produces the matroid .

Realization
The uniform matroid  may be represented as the matroid of affinely independent subsets of  points in general position in -dimensional Euclidean space, or as the matroid of linearly independent subsets of  vectors in general position in an -dimensional real vector space.

Every uniform matroid may also be realized in projective spaces and vector spaces over all sufficiently large finite fields. However, the field must be large enough to include enough independent vectors. For this reason, uniform matroids play an important role in Rota's conjecture concerning the forbidden minor characterization of the matroids that can be realized over finite fields.

Algorithms
The problem of finding the minimum-weight basis of a weighted uniform matroid is well-studied in computer science as the selection problem. It may be solved in linear time.

Any algorithm that tests whether a given matroid is uniform, given access to the matroid via an independence oracle, must perform an exponential number of oracle queries, and therefore cannot take polynomial time.

Related matroids
Unless , a uniform matroid  is connected: it is not the direct sum of two smaller matroids.
The direct sum of a family of uniform matroids (not necessarily all with the same parameters) is called a partition matroid.

Every uniform matroid is a paving matroid, a transversal matroid and a strict gammoid.

Not every uniform matroid is graphic, and the uniform matroids provide the smallest example of a non-graphic matroid, . Other than these examples, every uniform matroid  with  contains  as a minor and therefore is not graphic.

The -point line provides an example of a Sylvester matroid, a matroid in which every line contains three or more points.

See also
K-set (geometry)

References

Matroid theory